Thomas Fleming (5 April 1848 – 14 October 1930) was a New Zealand flourmiller. He was born in Holme Farm, Lanarkshire, Scotland, on 5 April 1848 and immigrated to New Zealand in 1862. Fleming was mayor of Invercargill from 1888 to 1889.

References

1848 births
1930 deaths
Scottish emigrants to New Zealand
Millers
People from Lanarkshire